This is a list of the busiest railway stations in Germany, with all stations being considered as major stations or hubs, and are also classified as either Category 1 or Category 2 stations.

An asterisk (*) indicates that the station only has rapid transit/commuter rail services.

The following table shows the cities with the most passenger entries/exits for all major stations within the city combined. This only includes major stations with official statistics (usually either Category 1 or Category 2 stations). Other "major" stations without official statistics are not included.

References

 
Busiest railway stations in Germany